The Slate River is a  tributary of the James River in the U.S. state of Virginia. The river's course is entirely within Buckingham County.

See also
List of rivers of Virginia

References

USGS Hydrologic Unit Map - State of Virginia (1974)

Rivers of Virginia
Tributaries of the James River
Rivers of Buckingham County, Virginia